Freddy Scholz (born 14 September 1961) is a German fencer. He competed in the individual and team sabre events at the 1984 Summer Olympics.

References

External links
 

1961 births
Living people
German male fencers
Olympic fencers of West Germany
Fencers at the 1984 Summer Olympics
Sportspeople from Düsseldorf